Meyerton is a former settlement on Baker Island. The town was named for Captain H. A. Meyer, United States Army, who in 1935 assisted in establishing living quarters and rainwater cisterns for colonists arriving on the island for the purpose of mining the guano deposits.

History
They built substantial dwellings and structures. In December 1941, most of the buildings were destroyed by the Japanese military, and in January 1942, the residents were evacuated.

References

Baker Island
Ghost towns in Oceania
Ghost towns in the United States
1935 establishments in Oceania
Populated places established in 1935
1935 establishments in the United States
Populated places disestablished in 1942
1942 disestablishments in Oceania
1942 disestablishments in the United States